The LG G7 ThinQ, commonly referred to as just LG G7, is an Android smartphone developed by LG Electronics as part of the LG G series. It was officially announced on May 2, 2018, after about a week of official leaks by LG. It is the second product from LG that uses the ThinQ branding. The device serves as the successor to the 2017 LG G6.

Specifications

Hardware 
The LG G7 ThinQ utilizes a metal chassis with a glass backing, and is IP68-rated for water and dust-resistance. It is available in black, blue, rose and silver-color finishes. The G7 features a 1440p FullVision IPS LCD display, with a diagonal size of 6.1 inches. The display uses a 19:9 aspect ratio that is taller than the 18:9 displays used by the majority of smartphones, such as the Samsung Galaxy S9. The display is capable of 
a maximum output of 1000 nits, with the help of an additional white sub-pixel in the matrix. The display is HDR10-capable, supporting high dynamic range playback of YouTube and Netflix content. The G7 was also designed with slim bezels and a notch, similar to the iPhone X, which LG calls a "second screen." Unlike Apple's notch, the notch can be blacked out on the G7.

The G7 utilizes the Qualcomm Snapdragon 845 system-on-chip with 4 GB of RAM. It is offered with 64 GB of internal storage, expandable via SD card. It supports wireless charging, and all models will support Qualcomm Quick Charge 4. All models in all markets will include quad Digital-to-analog converters (DAC) to enhance sound output, unlike the G6, which limited the quad DAC to select Asian markets.

There is a button on the side of the phone similar to Samsung's Bixby button; while it cannot be remapped, it launches Google Assistant when held, rather than a different A.I. Double tapping the button launches Google Lens.

The camera is a dual setup, with a primary lens and wide-angle lens, both are 16 MP.  In the camera app there is a portrait mode button and AI cam button which identifies 18 different situations such as pet mode, food mode, a sunset mode, fruit mode etc.

Software 
The LG G7 ThinQ ships with Android 8.0 "Oreo" and LG's UX skin. On June 29, 2018 a software update introduced 4K video recording at 60 FPS. In January 2019, LG released an update to Android 9 "Pie" in South Korea. 2020 saw Android 10 updates in most regions.

Variants

LG G7 One 
The LG G7 One was released in selected markets (such as Canada) in late-2018 as part of the Android One program. It is visually identical to the G7 ThinQ, except the glass backing has a softer, frosted finish, as opposed to the polished appearance of the ThinQ. Its hardware is slightly downgraded from the G7 ThinQ, utilizing a Snapdragon 835 system-on-chip over the 845, 4 GB of RAM and 32 GB of expandable storage, a 3,000 mAh battery, and removing the second, wide-angle rear camera lens. As with all Android One phones, it uses the standard Android user interface and Google apps instead of LG UX (similarly to the former Nexus series, such as the LG-manufactured Nexus 5X); it ships with Android 8.1, and LG committed to releasing at least two major releases of Android for the device, as well as providing three years of security patch support. Android 9.0 "Pie" was released for the G7 One in November 2018, followed by Android 10 in December 2019, and Android 11 in March 2021.

MobileSyrup noted some regressions over the G7 ThinQ due to the differences in hardware, especially in regards to battery life (such as the SoC downgrade resulting in a lack of Quick Charge 4+ support, and the G7 line's use of LCD over OLED as affecting its efficiency), but that the G7 One was "mostly fluid" and retained much of the ThinQ's hardware features (such as its audio support) whilst excluding LG's often-criticized user experience. Due to its positioning and launch pricing, comparisons were drawn to the OnePlus 6T, but it was argued that although the 6T had a Snapdragon 845, a larger battery and an OLED display, the G7 One did have a sharper display with HDR support, a headphone jack with a DAC, and official IP certification for waterproofing.

In December 2018, the G7 One was released in Japan as the LG X5 Android One. In January 2019, it was announced for South Korea as the LG Q9 One, exclusively to LG U+ in a 64 GB model.

LG G7 Fit 
The LG G7 Fit was unveiled alongside the G7 One; it is a low-end variant of the ThinQ model, utilizing a Snapdragon 821 SoC with 4 GB of RAM, and featuring a 16 megapixel camera.

See also 
 LG G series
 Comparison of smartphones

References 

Android (operating system) devices
LG Electronics smartphones
Mobile phones introduced in 2018
Mobile phones with multiple rear cameras
Mobile phones with 4K video recording
Discontinued smartphones